Eternity's Wheel is a fantasy and science fiction novel by Neil Gaiman, Michael Reaves and Mallory Reaves. It is the third novel in the InterWorld trilogy; previous volumes were the 2007 novel InterWorld and its 2013 sequel The Silver Dream.  Eternity's Wheel was issued by HarperTeen, an imprint of HarperCollins Publishers, on May 19, 2015.

Background
Eternity's Wheel credits the story to Neil Gaiman, Michael Reaves, and Mallory Reaves with a "written by" credit being assigned to Michael Reaves and Mallory Reaves. In a YouTube posting from April, 2013, Gaiman explained that he met up with Reaves and Reaves (who are father and daughter) to plot out the third volume of the trilogy, but as with the previous volume in the InterWorld series, Gaiman's commitment to other projects prevented him from doing actual writing work on the book.  The elder Reaves, meanwhile, suffers from Parkinson's disease, and was therefore unable to actually perform much (if any) writing work.  Consequently, Eternity's Wheel was essentially written in its entirety by Mallory Reaves, with story notes and editing advice from the two credited co-authors.

References

2015 American novels
2015 fantasy novels
American fantasy novels
Collaborative novels
Novels by Neil Gaiman
American young adult novels
HarperCollins books
InterWorld